Sylva Kelegian (born February 22, 1962) is an Armenian-American actress.

She was born in New York City on February 22, 1962. She appeared in such television shows as Law & Order, Desperate Housewives, Invasion, Prison Break, ER (TV series) and NYPD Blue.

She portrays Ivy Starnes in Atlas Shrugged (2011), the film adaptation of Ayn Rand's novel of the same name.

External links

American people of Armenian descent
American television actresses
Living people
1962 births
21st-century American women